Digital arteries are arteries that relate to fingers and toes.

These include:
 Common palmar digital arteries
 Common plantar digital arteries
 Dorsal digital arteries of foot
 Dorsal digital arteries of hand
 Proper palmar digital arteries
 Proper plantar digital arteries